Fallen Angel is an ITV crime drama series, first broadcast on 11 March 2007, which is based on the Roth Trilogy of novels by Andrew Taylor. It tells the story of Rosie Byfield, a clergyman's daughter, who grows up to be a psychopathic killer. It has an unusual narrative that moves backwards in time as it uncovers the layers of Rosie's past. Starring Charles Dance and Emilia Fox, the series was subtitled The Making of a Murderer for the DVD release, which followed on 19 March.

Plot
Set in 2007 London, the first episode begins with the ordination of a female curate, Mary Appleton, who is the first female curate in the fictitious diocese of Roslington. Moving backwards from episode one, the second episode starts in 1987 with Rosie, aged 16, applying for university in Roth (Little Missenden). Going back even farther, episode three focuses on Rosie's childhood when her father was a dean at Roslington Cathedral in 1973 (St Albans).

Cast
 Charles Dance as David Byfield
 Clare Holman as Wendy Ellis
 Barbara Wilshere as Audrey Oliphant
 Richard Manlove as Francis Youlgreave
 Emilia Fox as Rosemary "Rosie" Byfield
 Peter Capaldi as Henry Appleton
 Sheila Hancock as Lady Youlgrave
 Niamh Cusack as Vanessa Byfield

Episode list

External links

2000s British drama television series
2007 British television series debuts
2007 British television series endings
British drama television series
ITV television dramas
ITV (TV network) original programming
Films directed by David Drury